Eupterote petola is a moth in the family Eupterotidae. It was described by Frederic Moore in 1860. It is found on Java in Indonesia.

The wingspan is 60–65 mm for males and 65–70 mm for females. The wings are yellow, crossed by parallel dark bands. The basal area is dark greyish-brown to bluish black-brown.

References

Moths described in 1860
Eupterotinae